John Thornton Hart (30 September 1936 – 15 November 2011) was a classics master at Malvern College and winner of the 1975 series of the BBC television series Mastermind. Within English law, Hart is also notable as being a party in the House of Lords case Pepper v Hart, which was a landmark decision in English law concerning the use of legislative history in statutory interpretation. Hart was the first man to win Mastermind, as women won the first three series of the show between 1972 and 1974.

References

1936 births
2011 deaths
Contestants on British game shows
English case law
Schoolteachers from Worcestershire
People associated with Malvern, Worcestershire
Place of birth missing